The Leinster GAA Hurling Senior Championship, known simply as the Leinster Championship, is an annual inter-county hurling competition organised by the Leinster Council of the Gaelic Athletic Association (GAA). It is the highest inter-county hurling competition in the province of Leinster, and has been contested every year since the 1888 championship.

The final, usually held on the first Sunday in July, serves as the culmination of a series of games played during May and June, and the results determine which team receives the Bob O'Keeffe Cup. The championship was previously played on a straight knockout basis whereby once a team lost they were eliminated from the championship; however, as of 2018, the championship involved a round-robin system.

The Leinster Championship is an integral part of the wider GAA Hurling All-Ireland Senior Championship. The winners of the Leinster final, like their counterparts in the Munster Championship, are rewarded by advancing directly to the semi-final stage of the All-Ireland series of games. The losers of the Leinster final enter the All-Ireland series at the quarter-final stage, while the third-placed team advances to the preliminary quarter-finals.

Five teams currently participate in the Leinster Championship. The most successful team in hurling, namely Kilkenny, play their provincial hurling in the Leinster Championship. They have won the provincial title on 71 occasions while they have also claimed 36 All-Ireland titles.

Fifteen teams have competed since the inception of the Leinster Championship in 1888. The title has been won at least once by six teams, all of whom have won the title more than once. Kilkenny are the current champions.

History

Development

Following the foundation of the Gaelic Athletic Association in 1884, new rules for Gaelic football and hurling were drawn up and published in the United Irishman newspaper. In 1886, county committees began to be established, with several counties affiliating over the next few years. The GAA ran its inaugural All-Ireland Senior Hurling Championship in 1887. The decision to establish that first championship was influenced by several factors. Firstly, inter-club contests in 1885 and 1886 were wildly popular and began to draw huge crowds. Clubs started to travel across the country to play against each other and these matches generated intense interest as the newspapers began to speculate which teams might be considered the best in the country. Secondly, although the number of clubs was growing, many were slow to affiliate to the Association, leaving it short of money. Establishing a central championship held the prospect of enticing GAA clubs to process their affiliations, just as the establishment of the FA Cup had done much in the 1870s to promote the development of the Football Association in England. The championships were open to all affiliated clubs who would first compete in county-based competitions, to be run by local county committees. The winners of each county championship would then proceed to represent that county in the All-Ireland series. For the first and only time in its history the All-Ireland Championship used an open draw format. Six teams entered the first championship, however, this number increased to nine in 1888. Because of this, and in an effort to reduce travelling costs, the GAA decided to introduce provincial championships in Munster and Leinster.

Beginnings

The inaugural Leinster Championship featured Dublin, Kildare, Kilkenny and Laois. Dublin and Kildare contested the very first match on Sunday 3 June 1888. Postponements, disqualifications, objections, withdrawals and walkovers were regular occurrences during the initial years of the championship. No championship took place in 1892 as Dublin were the only team to enter and were deemed the Leinster representatives in the subsequent All-Ireland series. Kilkenny rejoined the championship, however, the finals of 1893 and 1894 ended in walkovers.

Format

Between 1888 and 2017 the Leinster Championship was a knockout tournament whereby once a team was defeated they were eliminated from the championship. In the early years the pairings were drawn at random and there was no seeding. Each match was played as a single leg. If a match ended in a draw there was a replay. Drawn replays were settled with extra time; however, if both sides were still level at the end of extra time a second replay took place and so on until a winner was found. Extra-time was eventually adopted in the event of a draw for all championship games except the final.

The dominance of Kilkenny and Wexford throughout the 1960s and 1970s lead to both these teams being placed on opposite sides of the championship draw, however, this seeding system was later abolished.

The Leinster Council expanded the championship with the introduction of a group stage for the four "weakest" teams in 2000. Carlow, Dublin, Laois and Westmeath contested this group stage, with the winning team advancing to the semi-final stage of the championship proper with Kilkenny, Offaly and Wexford. This group stage system was abolished after only one year in favour of a preliminary stage knock-out championship for the "weakest" teams. Carlow, Kildare, Laois, Meath, Wicklow and Westmeath played three knock-out rounds, with the one remaining team qualifying for the quarter-final stage of the championship proper. This system remained in place, albeit with some minor adjustments, until 2005 when the "weakest" teams moved to the Christy Ring Cup and Nicky Rackard Cup.

By 2014 the number of teams participating in the Leinster Championship had risen to ten. A number of one-sided games in recent years saw the return of a group stage for the five designated "weakest" teams. Antrim, Carlow, Laois, London and Westmeath contested the group stage with each team playing each other once. The top two teams in the league advanced to the quarter-finals of the championship proper. The team placed fourth played the Christy Ring Cup winner in a promotion play-off, while the bottom-placed was relegated to the Christy Ring Cup for the following year. This format ended in 2017.

The Leinster Championship was an integral part of the All-Ireland Senior Hurling Championship. Between 1888 and 1996 the Leinster final winners automatically qualified for either the All-Ireland semi-final or final. The introduction of the "back door" system in 1997 allowed the defeated Leinster finalists access to the All-Ireland quarter-final, while the Leinster champions received a bye to the All-Ireland semi-final. The "back door" system was replaced in 2002 by the All-Ireland Qualifiers which afforded every defeated team in the Leinster Championship the chance of qualifying for the All-Ireland Championship. Between 2005 and 2007 both Munster finalists qualified for the All-Ireland quarter-finals, however, this system was abolished in 2008 with the Leinster champions receiving a bye to the All-Ireland semi-final.

Current format

Championship
There are five teams in the Leinster Championship. During the course of a season (from May to June) each team plays the others once (a single round-robin system) for a total of 10 games. Teams receive two points for a win and one point for a draw. No points are awarded for a loss. Teams are ranked by total points and then head-to-head results. The top two teams in the group contest the Leinster final.

Qualification for the All-Ireland Championship
As of the 2018 championship, qualification for the All-Ireland Championship has changed due to the abolition of the qualifiers. The Leinster champions continue to receive a bye to the All-Ireland semi-final while the defeated Leinster finalists enter the All-Ireland quarter-finals. The third-placed team in the group enter the All-Ireland Championship at the preliminary quarter-final stage where they play either the champions or runners-up of the Joe McDonagh Cup.

Promotion and relegation
A system of promotion and relegation exists between the Leinster Championship and the Joe McDonagh Cup. If a Connacht, Leinster or Ulster team win the Joe McDonagh Cup, the bottom team in the Leinster group are relegated to the following year's Joe McDonagh Cup and replaced in the Leinster championship by the Joe McDonagh champions.

Teams

2023 championship
The following six teams will compete for the 2023 Leinster Senior Hurling championship.

Other teams
The following teams did not compete in the Leinster Championship in 2023, but have previously competed in the Leinster Championship for at least one season.

Historic team changes

In spite of Leinster consisting of twelve counties, many of these are dominated by Gaelic football and do not compete at a serious level in hurling. Louth became the fifth team to join the championship in 1889, however, they subsequently withdrew and only contested three further championships in 1901, 1919 and 1920. Kildare also had a similar relationship with the championship. After fielding a team in the inaugural provincial campaign their involvement in later campaigns was sporadic.

Wexford, in spite of contesting the open draw All-Ireland Championship in 1887, did not field a team the inaugural Leinster Championship. They first competed in 1890 and, apart from a few absences, have remained in the championship ever since. Offaly's first involvement in the championship was in 1897.

Westmeath joined the championship in 1913 while Meath entered the championship for the first time in 1919. They were regular participants until the 1960s when they regraded. They made a brief return to the championship in the late 1990s and early 2000s.

Wicklow first fielded a team in the championship in 1943, however, their appearances in subsequent championship campaigns were sporadic.

After winning the All-Ireland Intermediate Hurling Championship in 1962, Carlow fielded a team at senior level for the first time the following year. They remained in the Leinster Championship until regrading in 1966, however, they were regular participants once again from the 1990s onward.

Longford remain the only county never to have fielded a team in the Leinster Championship.

Non-Leinster teams

Due to a lack of meaningful competition in their own respective provinces, Antrim and Galway pushed for entry to the Leinster Championship in the early 2000s. At a special meeting of Congress on 4 October 2008, delegates voted to include Galway and Antrim in a restructured Leinster Championship on a trial basis for three years. Dublin, Wexford and Offaly spoke against the move; however, when put to a vote approximately 80% of delegates voted in favour. Antrim remained in the championship until their relegation to the Christy Ring Cup in 2015.

In 2016 Kerry, in spite of being based in the province of Munster, joined the Leinster Championship after gaining promotion following victory in the Christy Ring Cup. They remained in the province for two championship seasons.

Non-Irish teams

In 2013, an English team participated in the Leinster Championship for the first time after London gained promotion from the Christy Ring Cup. They made their debut in a 4–17 to 2–13 defeat by Carlow on 18 May 2013. The first Leinster Championship match to be played outside Ireland was London's home match at the Emerald GAA Grounds against Carlow on 27 April 2014.

Venues

History

Leinster Championship matches were traditionally played at neutral venues or at a location that was deemed to be halfway between the two participants; however, teams eventually came to home and away agreements depending on the capacity of their stadiums. Every second meeting between these teams was played at the home venue of one of them.

Attendances
Stadium attendances are a significant source of regular income for the Leinster Council and for the teams involved. For the 2016 championship proper, average attendances were 11,571 with a total aggregate attendance figure of 69,429. The 2017 final between Galway and Wexford saw a record attendance of 60,032.

Group stage
Fixtures in the five group stage rounds of the championship are played at the home ground of one of the two teams. Each team is guaranteed two home games.

Semi-finals
Between 1888 and 1978 the semi-finals were played at a selection of venues around the province. A series of poorly-attended semi-finals by the 1970s lead to the decision by the Leinster Council to play both semi-finals at the same venue as part of a double-header. This occurred for the first time on 24 June 1979 when Kilkenny played Dublin and Wexford played Offaly at Geraldine Park in Athy. From 1980 until 2001 the semi-finals were played as a double-header at Croke Park, with the exception of 1993 when Dr. Cullen Park in Carlow was the venue. In 2002 the semi-finals were played outside of Leinster for the first time ever when Semple Stadium in Thurles hosted the penultimate games due to reconstruction work taking place at Croke Park. After that the semi-finals were played on different dates and at different venues around the province until their abolition after the 2017 championship.

Final
The final has been played exclusively at Croke Park since 1962. Prior to this, the final had been played at Croke Park on a number of occasions; however, smaller provincial venues were also used, most notably Nowlan Park in Kilkenny or O'Moore Park in Portlaoise. In 2018 the final was held in Semple Stadium in Thurles.

Managers

Managers in the Leinster Championship are involved in the day-to-day running of the team, including the training, team selection, and sourcing of players from the club championships. Their influence varies from county-to-county and is related to the individual county boards. From 2018, all inter-county head coaches must be Award 2 qualified. The manager is assisted by a team of two or three selectors and an extensive backroom team consisting of various coaches. Prior to the development of the concept of a manager in the 1970s, teams were usually managed by a team of selectors with one member acting as chairman.

The championship's longest-serving manager was Brian Cody, who has been in charge of Kilkenny from November 1998 until 2022.

Trophy and medals

At the end of the Leinster final, the winning team is presented with a trophy. The Bob O'Keeffe Cup is held by the winning team until the following year's final. Traditionally, the presentation is made at a special rostrum in the stand where GAA and political dignitaries and special guests view the match.

The cup is decorated with ribbons in the colours of the winning team. During the game the cup actually has both teams' sets of ribbons attached and the runners-up ribbons are removed before the presentation. The winning captain accepts the cup on behalf of his team before giving a short speech. Individual members of the winning team then have an opportunity to come to the rostrum to lift the cup.

The cup is named after Bob O'Keeffe. He was an All-Ireland medal winner with Laois in 1915 before later serving as chairman of the Leinster Council and President of the Gaelic Athletic Association. Following his death the GAA decided to donate a trophy in his memory. The Bob O'Keeffe Memorial Cup was bought for £700 in 1949 and first presented in 1950. Standing three feet eight inches in height, weighing 564 ounces and with a capacity of 6 gallons, the cup was one of the most recognisable due to its sheer size. The Celtic chase work was taken from the Book of Kells. The hurler depicted on the top of the cup was barefooted – a reference to O'Keeffe who often played matches in his bare feet. The original Bob O'Keeffe Cup was awarded for the last time in 2004. A combination of old age and wear and tear resulted in the cup being retired to the GAA Museum in Croke Park.

In 2005 the new Bob O'Keeffe Cup was presented for the first time. The new trophy was made in 1894 in London of Victorian silver, but was idle since 1920 when it was last presented as a racing trophy. Valued at €25,000, the cup was bought in a jewellers' shop in Temple Bar.

In accordance with GAA rules, the Leinster Council awards up to twenty-six gold medals to the winners of the Leinster final. A 2012 Leinster Championship winners' medal was sold on eBay for €570.

Sponsorship
Since 1995, the Leinster Championship has been sponsored. The sponsor has usually been able to determine the championship's sponsorship name.

Media coverage
In the early years of coverage Radio Éireann had exclusive radio coverage of championship games. When Telefís Éireann was established on 31 December 1961, the new station was interested in the broadcasting of championship games. The GAA, however, were wary that live television coverage would result in lower attendances at games. Because of this, the association restricted annual coverage of its games to the All-Ireland hurling and football finals, the two All-Ireland football semi-finals and the two Railway Cup finals.

The first live broadcast of a Leinster final took place on Network 2 on 14 July 1996.

In 2007, it was announced that TV3 had signed a three-year broadcasting deal with the GAA, resulting in senior inter-county championship games not being broadcast exclusively on RTÉ for the first time since 1962. TV3's first live championship broadcast was the final between Kilkenny and Wexford on 6 July 2008. Following the completion of the initial three-year deal in 2010, the GAA were satisfied to give TV3 an expanded role in Gaelic games broadcasting. TV3 broadcast one of the semi-finals over the next three years, however, RTÉ retained the rights to the other matches, including the final.

Since 2014, Sky Sports and RTÉ have shared live coverage of championship matches. Sky broadcast their first championship match, a quarter-final between Kilkenny and Offaly, on 7 June 2014.

Championship upsets
The possibility of unlikely victories in the various rounds of the championship, where lower ranked teams beat higher placed opposition in what is known as a "giant killing", is much anticipated by the public. Such upsets are considered an integral part of the tradition and unpredictable nature of the championship, and the attention gained by giant-killing teams can be as great as that for winners of the championship. Almost every team in the championship has a fondly remembered giant-killing act in its history. It is considered particularly newsworthy when a top championship team suffers an upset defeat.

Westmeath's championship run (1937): After winning the All-Ireland Junior Hurling Championship the previous year, Westmeath joined the senior championship in 1937. Defeats of Meath, Offaly and Laois in the earlier rounds saw them qualify for the Leinster final for the first and only time in their history. Westmeath looked as though they would create a major upset when they were leading reigning champions Kilkenny going into the final quarter. Two late goals gave Kilkenny a fortunate 5–3 to 2–4 victory.
Offaly 5–10 Wexford 3–11 (29 June 1969): Offaly had been described as the David of inter-county hurling when facing reigning All-Ireland champions Wexford in the Leinster semi-final. At half-time they held a 5–4 to 0–5 lead, with Paddy Molloy scoring 3–4 of his team's total by the end.
Offaly 3–17 Kilkenny 5–10 (13 July 1980): Undoubtedly regarded as one of the most significant days in the history of Offaly hurling. Offaly were only appearing in their sixth Leinster final ever and were looking for their first success, while Kilkenny were looking for a third consecutive provincial title. After a high-scoring first-half, Kilkenny only had a 3–6 to 1–10 lead. The game reached its climax in the final ten minutes as both sides swapped the lead several times. In the end, the Leinster final roll of honour had a new name as Offaly won the game by a point.
Wexford 2–15 Kilkenny 1–16 (13 June 2004): Kilkenny were the red-hot favourites coming into this provincial semi-final. They were on the trail of a record-breaking seventh consecutive Leinster title and a third consecutive All-Ireland title.  The game was going Kilkenny's way until the last puck of the game. Wexford had tested the champions but with time nearly up 'the Cats' still had a one-point lead. A Kilkenny clearance fell straight to Michael Jacob who made no mistake in sending the sliotar into the net. With that the referee sounded the long whistle and Kilkenny's great run was at an end.
Galway 2–21 Kilkenny 2–11 (8 July 2012): Galway secured their first ever Leinster title with a devastating display against a Kilkenny team seeking an eighth successive title. Joe Canning scored their first goal after three minutes and held a commanding 2–12 to 0–4 half-time lead. A shell-shocked Kilkenny rallied in the second half but only managed to come within ten points of Galway by the end.
Laois 0–29 Offaly 0–21 (7 June 2015): This was described as the most complete performance by Laois ever. After a week of turmoil which saw their manager, Séamus Plunkett, resign before resuming his post, Laois added to Offaly's hurling woes with an eight-point defeat.
Westmeath 2–22 Offaly 1–11 (1 May 2016): Offaly and Westmeath had operated in different spheres since their last championship meeting in 1976 with many believing that Offaly would record an easy victory. Offaly trailed 1–9 to 0–7 at half-time, which was not indicative of Westmeath's dominance, but into a strong wind after the break, Westmeath fired five points in five minutes to pull out of sight.
Wexford 1–20 Kilkenny 3–11 (10 June 2017): Wexford had earlier defeated Kilkenny in the quarter-final of the National Hurling League, however, many believed that a repeat performance six weeks later would be beyond Wexford. Their manager, Davy FitzGerald, was also banished to the stands after an incident in the league. Kilkenny had the luxury of an early goal, however, they seemed uncharacteristically nervous. Lee Chin was inspirational for Wexford in a play-making role at midfield as Wexford blew the championship wide open with a three-point victory.
Westmeath 2-15 Wexford 0-21 (14 May 2022): Westmeath earned a memorable result in the Leinster Senior Hurling Championship, holding Wexford to a draw at TEG Cusack Park, Mullingar. A last-gasp goal from Derek McNicholas earned the Midlanders a 2-15 to 0-21 draw after an excellent performance; the veteran substitute raising a green flag in the fifth minute of stoppage time. Niall Mitchell provided the hosts’ other goal, while Killian Doyle was their top-scorer with 0-11 (nine frees, one ’65). Westmeath finished with 14 men, after Davy Glennon was shown a second yellow card with four minutes of normal time remaining. A win would have guaranteed place in the All-Ireland for Wexford in the Leinster Championship with a game to spare as they would have finished in the top 3 in Leinster but they were denied by a Westmeath side who also impressively beat Laois by 18 points on the final day of the Championship to finish 3 points above the relegation spot.

General statistics
''

List of Finals

A.  A goal outweighed any number of points until 1892. Points were only taken into consideration when the teams finished level on goals.
B.  Dublin received a walkover from Laois in the final. Louth were the only other team to participate.
C.  Goals were revalued to five points each. Dublin were unopposed in the championship.
D.  Dublin were unopposed in the championship.
E.  Goals were revalued to three points each. The final was replayed after Kilkenny launched an objection following the original match.
F.  Kilkenny were awarded the title as the Dublin goal was disputed.
G.  Dublin won the final; however, Kilkenny were awarded the title after launching an objection.
H.  The final was declared void after both teams were disqualified for being late on the field.
I.  All inter-county games were increased from sixty to eighty minutes.
J.  All inter-county games were reduced from eighty to seventy minutes.

See also
 All-Ireland Senior Hurling Championship
 Munster Senior Hurling Championship
 Ulster Senior Hurling Championship
 Connacht Senior Hurling Championship

Sources

References

 
1888 establishments in Ireland
 
Senior inter-county hurling competitions